East Asian typography is the application of typography to the writing systems of Chinese, Japanese, Korean, and Vietnamese languages. Scripts used in East Asian typography include Chinese characters (known as kanji in Japanese, hanja in Korean, and Chữ Hán in Vietnamese), hiragana, katakana, hangul, and Chữ Nôm.

History 

Typography with movable type was invented during the eleventh-century Song dynasty in China by Bi Sheng (990–1051). His movable type system was manufactured from ceramic materials, and clay type printing continued to be practiced in China until the Qing dynasty.

Wang Zhen was one of the pioneers of wooden movable type. Although the wooden type was more durable under the mechanical rigors of handling, repeated printing wore the character faces down and the types could be replaced only by carving new pieces.

Metal movable type was first invented in Korea during the Goryeo dynasty, approximately 1230. Hua Sui introduced bronze type printing to China in 1490 AD. The diffusion of both movable-type systems was limited and the technology did not spread beyond East and Central Asia, however.

Before the 19th century, woodblock printing was favored over movable type to print East Asian text, because movable type required reusable types for thousands of Chinese characters. During the Ming dynasty, Ming typefaces were developed with straight and angular strokes, which made them easier to carve from woodblocks than calligraphic forms such as regular script.

Movable type for Chinese characters was popularized in the mid-19th century by American missionary William Gamble, who led the American Presbyterian Mission Press (APMP) in Ningbo and Shanghai from 1858 to 1869. Gamble developed an electrotyping-based process to reproduce Chinese character types. This method produced characters that were clearer and more closely resembled calligraphic glyphs, and it allowed the types to be made in smaller sizes without reducing quality. In 1873, Motogi established the first type foundry in Japan, Tsukiji Type Foundry. Japanese type foundries invented heiti typefaces inspired by Latin sans serif fonts, as well as variations of the Ming typeface. Japanese typefaces influenced type design across China and Japan. Also, the emergence of newspapers in the 19th century made movable type a worthwhile investment.

With the establishment of the People's Republic of China in 1949, type designers in mainland China aimed to break free from Japanese stylistic influences by creating typefaces that looked more like handwritten Chinese. Starting in the 1960s, the state-owned Shanghai Printing Technology and Research Institute (SPTRI) developed new typefaces for Simplified Chinese in the four main Chinese type families: imitation Song, gothic, Ming, and regular script. Of these type families, the communist government favored gothic typefaces because they were plain and "represented a break with the past." The SPTRI was subsequently privatized in the 1990s.

Type families

Ming typefaces 

Ming or Song (known as Mincho in Japanese) is a style of typeface characterized by contrasting vertical and horizontal strokes with a small triangle nestled into the stroke. These are called  (literally "fish scales") and are analogous to serifs in Latin typefaces.

Gothic typefaces 

Gothic typefaces, known as hēitǐ in Chinese, are the equivalent of sans-serif fonts in East Asian scripts. They can be further divided into two main types: round sans fonts have rounded ends, while square sans fonts have square ends.

Imitation Song

Regular script

Typographic conventions

Typographic symbols 
Japanese has a set of characteristic punctuation marks, see List of Japanese typographic symbols.

Instead of underlines or cursive, Chinese, Japanese and Korean use emphasis marks.

Ruby text 

Ruby characters are small, annotative glosses that are usually placed above or to the right of Chinese logograms to show their pronunciation.

See also 

 CJK characters
 List of CJK fonts
 History of printing in East Asia

References

General sources 

 .

External links 
 Chinese Type Archive, an open database of Chinese typographical concepts and typefaces

 
Typography articles needing expert attention
Typography